The 1914 Baltimore Terrapins season was a season in American baseball. They finished in third place in the Federal League, 4½ games behind the Indianapolis Hoosiers.

Offseason 
 Prior to 1914 season
Vern Duncan jumped to the Terrapins from the Philadelphia Phillies.
Guy Zinn jumped to the Terrapins from the Boston Braves.

Regular season

Season standings

Record vs. opponents

Roster

Player stats

Batting

Starters by position 
Note: Pos = Position; G = Games played; AB = At bats; H = Hits; Avg. = Batting average; HR = Home runs; RBI = Runs batted in

Other batters 
Note: G = Games played; AB = At bats; H = Hits; Avg. = Batting average; HR = Home runs; RBI = Runs batted in

Pitching

Starting pitchers 
Note: G = Games pitched; IP = Innings pitched; W = Wins; L = Losses; ERA = Earned run average; SO = Strikeouts

Other pitchers 
Note: G = Games pitched; IP = Innings pitched; W = Wins; L = Losses; ERA = Earned run average; SO = Strikeouts

Relief pitchers 
Note: G = Games pitched; W = Wins; L = Losses; SV = Saves; ERA = Earned run average; SO = Strikeouts

Notes

References 
1914 Baltimore Terrapins at Baseball Reference

Baltimore Terrapins seasons
Baltimore Terrapins season
Balt